Percy Oldacre (25 October 1892 – 26 January 1970) was an English professional footballer who played as a centre-forward for Stoke, Sheffield Wednesday, Exeter City, Castleford Town, Sheffield United, Halifax Town, Crewe Alexandra, Shrewsbury Town, Port Vale, and Hurst.

Career
Oldacre began his career at Stoke, without making his first-team debut. He played for Sheffield Wednesday as a guest during World War I. He signed with Exeter City in the summer of 1919 and scored on his debut in a 2–1 win against Swansea City at St James Park in September. He rarely missed a Southern League game for the "Grecians" until he returned north the following year to join Castleford Town. He scored five goals in six First Division games for Sheffield United in 1921–22 and 1922–23. Despite his goal record he was never a first team regular at Bramall Lane. He spent the 1923–24 season with Halifax Town, scoring once in eight Third Division North matches at The Shay. He then switched to league rivals Crewe Alexandra, and scored 12 goals in 25 league games at Gresty Road in 1924–25. He moved on to Shrewsbury Town, before being signed by Second Division side Port Vale for £150 in August 1926. He made his debut at inside-right in a 2–2 draw with Swansea Town at Vetch Field on 11 December 1926, but was not selected again before being released from his contract at The Old Recreation Ground at the end of the season. He later played for Hurst, scoring five goals in four games in 1927; where he was in 1928 is unknown.

Career statistics
Source:

References

1892 births
1970 deaths
Footballers from Stoke-on-Trent
English footballers
Association football forwards
Stoke City F.C. players
Sheffield Wednesday F.C. wartime guest players
Exeter City F.C. players
Castleford Town F.C. players
Sheffield United F.C. players
Halifax Town A.F.C. players
Crewe Alexandra F.C. players
Shrewsbury Town F.C. players
Port Vale F.C. players
Ashton United F.C. players
Southern Football League players
English Football League players